Dhritarashtra (Sanskrit: धृतराष्ट्र) may refer to:

 Dhritarashtra (Dhṛtarāṣṭra), a character in the Hindu epic Mahabharata 
 Dhṛtarāṣṭra (Japanese: 持国天 "Jikoku"), a figure in Buddhist mythology, and one of the Four Heavenly Kings